Bonchamp-lès-Laval (literally Bonchamp near Laval) is a commune in the Mayenne department in northwestern France.

Population

See also
Communes of Mayenne

References

Communes of Mayenne